Mad as a Mars Hare is a 1963 Warner Bros. Merrie Melodies cartoon directed by Chuck Jones and Maurice Noble. The short was released on October 19, 1963, and stars Bugs Bunny and Marvin the Martian. The cartoon's title is a play-on-words of the famous phrase to be "mad as a March hare", the origins of which are disputed. This is Marvin's final appearance in the Looney Tunes shorts during the Golden Age of American Animation.

Plot
This cartoon begins with Marvin the Martian observing the planet Earth from Mars through a telescope. He is examining a rocket launch that is taking place. As he watches, the rocket takes off from Earth and soon appears to be heading straight towards him. Indeed, the rocket plows right through his observatory and once a shaken Marvin gets himself up, he says to the audience "I'm not angry, just terribly, terribly hurt!"

Soon enough, the rocket lands on Mars, and a reluctant Bugs Bunny exits it. It is quickly evident that he is the only occupant and he has been lured onto the rocket and then sent to Mars as what Earth considered an expendable “astro-rabbit.” With his successful landing, Bugs inadvertently claims Mars (via a metal carrot with a flag inside which plays Yankee Doodle) in the name of the Earth. However, Marvin does not agree with this and decides that he will not allow Bugs to take his planet away from him. After a failed attempt to disintegrate the rabbit via disintegrating pistol, which results in Marvin getting disintegrated himself and going off to be re-integrated, Marvin gets a Time-Space Gun and intends to project Bugs forward into time so he can use him as a useful but harmless slave.

However, when Marvin zaps Bugs, he realizes too late that he had the gun in reverse, so Bugs is reverted into a huge and muscular Neanderthal rabbit, who immediately grabs Marvin and crushes him with just one hand. Marvin goes off to be regenerated again, while saying: "Well, back to the old electronic brain!" (a possible reference to Hare-Way to the Stars). Bugs then comments to the audience about how when he gets back to Earth, Elmer Fudd and the rest of the hunters are due for a surprise, before eating the metal carrot.

Crew
Co-Director & Layouts: Maurice Noble
Story: John Dunn
Animation: Ken Harris, Richard Thompson, Bob Bransford & Tom Ray
Backgrounds: Bob Singer
Effects Animation: Harry Love
Film Editor: Treg Brown
Voice Characterizations: Mel Blanc
Music: Bill Lava
Produced by David H. DePatie
Directed by Chuck Jones

Home media
"Mad as a Mars Hare" is available on the Bugs Bunny: Hare Extraordinare DVD. However, it was cropped to widescreen. It is also being shown fully screened on the Looney Tunes Platinum Collection: Volume 1 Blu-ray box-set. It later became available on the DVD edition of the collection.

References

External links
 Mad as a Mars Hare at Internet Movie Database

1963 films
1963 animated films
1963 short films
Short films directed by Chuck Jones
Mars in film
Merrie Melodies short films
Warner Bros. Cartoons animated short films
Fiction about neanderthals
1960s science fiction comedy films
Films directed by Maurice Noble
American science fiction comedy films
Animated films about extraterrestrial life
Animated films about time travel
Films scored by William Lava
Bugs Bunny films
Marvin the Martian films
1963 comedy films
1960s Warner Bros. animated short films
1960s English-language films